Thomas Wainwright (1860 – 1940) was an English footballer who played in the Football League for Stoke.

Career
Wainwright was born in Stoke-upon-Trent and played for local church league side Stoke St Jude's before joining Stoke in 1888. He played his debut and only match in the Football League on the 15 September 1888, the second weekend of the 1888–89 season away at Wellington Road home of Aston Villa. Stoke lost the match 5–1. He was never selected for a league match again for Stoke but he did play and score in the FA Cup against Warwick County. However Stoke lost 2–1 and most of the side who played in that match were released and Wainwright joined Stoke Priory.

Career statistics

References

English footballers
Stoke City F.C. players
English Football League players
1940 deaths
1860 births
Association football forwards